Todor Aleksiev (born 21 April 1983) is a Bulgarian volleyball player who wears the No. 15 shirt in the national team which he has driven to major success in a number of competitions.

Aleksiev won bronze medals with the national team in the 2006 FIVB Volleyball Men's World Championship, 2007 FIVB Men's World Cup and 2009 Men's European Volleyball Championship. He won the "Best Scorer" and the "Best Receiver" award at the 2012 FIVB World League.

At club level, he plays in Bulgarian Volleyball League for Hebar Pazardzhik.

Sporting achievements

National Team
 2012: 4th place at Summer Olympics, Men's indoor volleyball tournament (London)
 2008: 5th place at Summer Olympics, Men's indoor volleyball tournament (Beijing)
 2006  Men's World Championship (Japan)
 2009  Men's European Championship (İzmir-Istanbul, Turkey)
 2007  Men's World Cup (Japan)
 2015  2015 European Games, Men's indoor volleyball tournament (Baku)
 2003  2003 FIVB Volleyball Men's U21 World Championship (Iran)

Clubs

International competitions
 2015   Men's Club World Championship, with UPCN San Juan
 2017   Men's South American Club Championship, with Personal Bolivar
 2016   Men's South American Club Championship, with UPCN San Juan
 2018   Men's CEV Challenge Cup, with Olympiacos Piraeus

National championships
 2004/2005  Bulgarian Championship, with Levski Sofia
 2005/2006  Bulgarian Championship, with Levski Sofia
 2015/2016  Argentinian Championship, with UPCN San Juan
 2016/2017  Argentinian Championship, with Personal Bolivar
 2017/2018  Greek Championship, with Olympiacos Piraeus
 2018/2019  Greek Championship, with Olympiacos Piraeus

National trophies
 2005/2006  Bulgarian Cup, with Levski Sofia
 2017/2018  Greek League Cup, with Olympiacos Piraeus
 2018/2019  Greek League Cup, with Olympiacos Piraeus

Individuals
 2012 World League "Best Receiver"
 2012 World League "Best Scorer"
 2015 Club World Championship "Best Outside Spiker"
 2017/18 Greek Volley League MVP

References

1983 births
Living people
Sportspeople from Plovdiv
Bulgarian men's volleyball players
Volleyball players at the 2008 Summer Olympics
Volleyball players at the 2012 Summer Olympics
Olympic volleyball players of Bulgaria
Olympiacos S.C. players
Bulgarian expatriates in Argentina
Bulgarian expatriates in Greece
Bulgarian expatriate sportspeople in Italy
Bulgarian expatriates in Russia
Bulgarian expatriate sportspeople in Turkey
Expatriate volleyball players in Greece
Expatriate volleyball players in Italy
Expatriate volleyball players in Russia
Expatriate volleyball players in Turkey
Volleyball players at the 2015 European Games
European Games medalists in volleyball
European Games silver medalists for Bulgaria
Ural Ufa volleyball players
Sporting CP volleyball players
Outside hitters